The Kryštofovo Údolí astronomical clock is an astronomical clock in Kryštofovo Údolí, Czech Republic. It is built in a former electrical substation. The project started in 2006, it was inaugurated on 20 September 2008, and completed in 2011.

The clock's construction was directed by Martin Chaloupka.

The clock has three dials, showing the time, the zodiac, and the lunar phase. It is driven by an electric motor.

As the clock chimes the hour, the twelve apostles file past two doors at the top of the clock, as on the Prague astronomical clock.

References

Astronomical clocks in the Czech Republic
Clock towers in the Czech Republic